Choo Ga-eun (born 5 January 2001) is a South Korean sports shooter. She competed in the women's 10 metre air pistol event at the 2020 Summer Olympics.

References

External links
 

2001 births
Living people
South Korean female sport shooters
Olympic shooters of South Korea
Shooters at the 2020 Summer Olympics
Place of birth missing (living people)
21st-century South Korean women